The William A. Jones Memorial Bridge, commonly known as the Jones Bridge, is an arched girder bridge that spans the Pasig River in the City of Manila, Philippines. It is named after the United States legislator William Atkinson Jones, who served as the chairman of the U.S. Insular Affairs House Committee which had previously exercised jurisdiction over the Philippines and the principal author of the Jones Law that gave the country legislative autonomy from the United States. Built to replace the historic Puente de España (Bridge of Spain) in the 1910s, the bridge connects Quintin Paredes Road at the Binondo district to Padre Burgos Avenue at the Ermita district.

Originally designed by Filipino architect Juan M. Arellano using French Neoclassical architecture, the first incarnation of the bridge features three arches resting on two heavy piers, adorned by faux-stone and concrete ornaments, as well as four sculptures on concrete plinths allegorically representing motherhood and nationhood. The original bridge was destroyed during the World War II by retreating Japanese troops and was reconstructed in 1946 by the U.S. and Philippine public works. The reconstructed bridge retained the three arches and two piers but removed all of the ornaments. The bridge was first partially restored in 1998. In 2019, the City Government of Manila began a rehabilitation project to "restore" the Jones Bridge to its near-original design using Beaux-Arts architecture similar to that of Pont Alexandre III in Paris and the return of all four La Madre Filipina sculptures.

History

First Jones Bridge (1919-1945) 

The Jones Bridge was originally commissioned under the auspices of the City Government of Manila in 1919 before the Insular Government, through the Philippine Bureau of Public Works, later took over in finishing the bridge's construction in 1920. The bridge was intended to replace the Puente de España (Bridge of Spain), the first bridge built to cross the Pasig River constructed during the Spanish colonial era and the last incarnation of bridges that span the same location since 1630.  It collapsed during the heavy rains of September 1914 that weakened the central pier collapsing the middle span of the bridge. The Puente, which was located at one block upriver at Calle Nueva (now E.T. Yuchengco Street), was temporarily kept open using a temporary truss bridge while the new bridge is being constructed at Quintin Paredes Street.

The construction of new bridges were part of a master plan of Manila Daniel Burnham, who wanted to give emphasis on the rivers of city and likened them to the Seine River in Paris and the canals of Venice. This plan was heavily implemented and supervised by William E. Parsons, but upon the passage of the Jones Act, Filipino architect Juan M. Arellano took over and finished the bridge's final design. Jones died in 1918 while the bridge is still being planned, and the Filipinos named the passageway to the lawmaker for authoring the law that will give the country an autonomy from the United States.

Arellano designed the bridge in the style of the passageways constructed during Haussmann's renovation of Paris. He embellished the piers with a statues of boys on dolphins, similar to the those on the Pont Alexandre III at the river Seine (which he had previously visited). Similar to the Parisian Pont, he marked both ends of the bridge with four plinths and commissioned a sculptor named Martinez to build four statues, called La Madre Filipina (The Philippine Motherland),  which would be placed on the pedestals.

World War II 

The bridge was renamed to Banzai Bridge during the Japanese occupation, by virtue of Executive Order No. 41 issued by Philippine Executive Commission Chairman Jorge B. Vargas in 1942. During the Second World War, the Japanese Army bombed the bridge against the incoming American troops during the Battle of Manila. One of the four statues was permanently lost during the destruction. After the war, a Bailey bridge was set up as a temporary passageway for vehicles while the main bridge itself is being rebuilt.

Second Jones Bridge (1946-present)

Post-war reconstruction 

Following the passage of the Philippine Rehabilitation Act of 1945, the Philippine Bureau of Public Works and the U.S. Bureau of Public Roads reconstructed the Jones and Quezon bridges using large and deep steel girders. Upon its completion, none of its original ornamentation on either piers and balustrades were restored, and its neoclassical aesthetic were replaced with an unadorned architecture in an urgent haste to finish its reconstruction.  The three remaining La Madre Filipina statues were also removed and its plinths were demolished. One was relocated within Rizal Park while the two others are relocated at the entrance of the Court of Appeals Main Building.

1998 restoration 

In 1998, in celebration of the Philippine Centennial Independence, the bridge was partially restored by architect Conrad Onglao, who was commissioned by then-First Lady Amelita Ramos. Stone balustrades replaced the post-modern steel design. During the time of Manila Mayor Lito Atienza, the steel girders were lighted and thematic lamp post were added onto the bridge, which drew mixed reactions.  Two fu dogs were also added at the base of the bridge's south side, which gave it a Chinese character as opposed to its original neoclassical design.

2019 redevelopment 

In 2019, Manila Mayor Isko Moreno announced plans to "restore" the Jones Bridge to its near-original architecture, including the return of the three surviving sculptures that had previously guarded the bridge, using the ₱20 million that were donated towards the project. The fourth sculpture destroyed by the war was replicated using the archives of the pre-war Jones Bridge in the National Library of the Philippines. Moreno commissioned Jose Acuzar, owner of Las Casas Filipinas de Acuzar to design and build Beaux-Arts-styled lamp posts similar to those on Pont Alexandre III. The four plinths for the La Madre Filipina statues were reconstructed that would act as the pedestal for the returning sculptures. Retrofit and repair works were also done at the steel girders of the bridge.

The statues of Gratitude and Democracy were reinstated at the bridge on November 22. Jones Bridge was inaugurated on November 24, 2019, and was formally opened to the public. However, the remaining statues of La Madre Filipina located at the grounds of the Court of Appeals were deemed too fragile to be moved for relocation to its original spot. They were instead replicated, then reinstated at their original location in June 2021.

Sculptures 

Four statues that guarded the bridge are collectively called La Madre Filipina (The Philippine Motherland). Three of them were spared from the war but was relocated. The fourth one was destroyed and it was replicated in the 2019 redevelopment. Each statue symbolizes the different aspect of nationhood since the Philippines at the time was transitioning from being a colony of the United States to gaining its independence.

 Gratitude: located at the southeast portion of the bridge, this sculpture was transferred to Rizal Park after World War II and was reinstated back to its original location after 74 years. It was prominently called as La Madre Filipina while on display at the park.
 Democracy: destroyed during the Battle of Manila in 1945. It was replicated in 2019 using archives provided by the National Library of the Philippines and was installed at the southwest corner of the bridge where the former statue once stood.
 Progress: located on the northwest portion of the bridge. It symbolizes, labor, education and power. A replica of the original statue was installed in June 2021, together with Justice. The original one located on the grounds of the Court of Appeals was deemed too fragile to be relocated.
 Justice: located on the northeast side of the bridge, it symbolizes law and order, and equality under the law.  A replica of the original statue was installed June 2021, together with Progress. The original one located on the grounds of the Court of Appeals was deemed too fragile to be relocated.

Traffic 

The Jones bridge rarely suffers from traffic congestion, which usually occurs at both ends of the bridge due to parking violations. Water buses of Pasig River Ferry Service also habitually pass under it to reach its Escolta Street station. Every January 9 of the year since 2013, the Metropolitan Manila Development Authority annually closes the bridge from car passage for a procession during the Feast of the Black Nazarene after the Department of Public Works and Highways deemed the nearby MacArthur Bridge unstable to accommodate increasing foot traffic during the festivities. However, the Translacion was rerouted to Ayala Bridge starting 2020, which has been recently retrofitted.

Incidents 

In 2012, the Philippine Coast Guard issued a ban on swimming along the Pasig River after three floating bodies were discovered within the vicinity of the bridge. In 2019, Pasig River Rehabilitation Commission rescued three teenagers who were struggling in swimming under the bridge from drowning.

In popular culture 

 The bridge was featured on 2021 Philippine romantic fantasy The Lost Recipe.
 The 2007 Filipino film The Promise has a scene in where Daniel (Richard Gutierrez) was tasked to assassinate someone underneath the bridge's tunnel, although he was unable to do it and sets the man free afterwards. 
 The bridge serves as the backdrop for the 1989 film Jones Bridge Massacre: Task Force Clabio starring Lito Lapid, which was based on real-life events.

Gallery

See also

 Spanish East Indies
 Spanish Filipino
 Philippine Spanish
 Chavacano
 Captaincy General of the Philippines
 Intramuros Grand Marian Procession
 Gates of Intramuros
 Fort Santiago
 List of crossings of the Pasig River
 List of Philippine historic sites

References 

 
 
 
 
 
 

Bridges in Manila
Buildings and structures in Binondo
Buildings and structures in Ermita
Neoclassical architecture in the Philippines
Juan M. Arellano buildings